Hubert Leonard Murray  (13 December 1886 – 10 December 1963) was an Australian colonial administrator who served as Administrator of Papua between 1940 and 1942

Biography
Murray was born in Watsons Bay, New South Wales in 1886 to  James Aubrey Gibbes Murray and Marian Edith Murray (née Lewis).

The nephew of Hubert Murray, who was appointed Lieutenant-Governor of Papua in 1908, Murray also moved to Papua in 1909 to become his uncle's assistant private secretary. He took part in the trials for the Australian Olympic swimming team for the 1912 Summer Olympics, but was narrowly defeated. He was promoted to private secretary in 1913, and married Pauline Anne Schomburgk in February 1915; the couple later had a son. In 1916 he became official secretary in 1916. He subsequently served in the territory's Legislative Council and Executive Council from 1925. In the 1936 New Year Honours he was made a CBE.

Murray was appointed Resident Magistrate in 1940, before succeeding his uncle as Lieutenant Governor later in the year, with the post renamed to "Administrator". He remained in post until the declaration of military rule in February 1942, at which point he moved to Sydney, where he joined the General Headquarters of the Allied Geographical Section.

He died at his home in the Sydney suburb of Manly on 10 December 1963.

References

1886 births
People from Sydney
Australian Commanders of the Order of the British Empire
Governors of the Territory of Papua
Members of the Legislative Council of Papua
Members of the Executive Council of Papua
1963 deaths